The 1920 Cornell Big Red football team was an American football team that represented Cornell University during the 1920 college football season.  In their first season under head coach Gil Dobie, the Big Red compiled a 6–2 record and outscored their opponents by a combined total of 231 to 68.

Schedule

References

Cornell
Cornell Big Red football seasons
Cornell Big Red football